Baljkovica is a village in the municipalities of Zvornik (Republika Srpska) and Sapna, Bosnia and Herzegovina.

Demographics 
According to the 2013 census, its population was 183, with 35 of them living in the Zvornik part thus 148 in the Sapna part.

References

Populated places in Sapna
Populated places in Zvornik